Oil on copper painting is the process of creating artworks by using oil paints with copper as the substrate. This is sometimes referred to as “copper as canvas” because canvas is the most well known surface material used for oil paintings.

History 
Oil on copper paintings were prevalent in the mid sixteenth century in Italy and Northern Europe. The use of copper as a substrate for an oil painting dates back to Medieval times. The Flemish masters and other artists including Jan Breughel the Elder, Claude, El Greco, Guido Reni, Guercino, Rembrandt, Carlo Saraceni, Ambrosius Bosschaert II, Copley Fielding and Vernet painted on copper. They favored copper for its smooth surface which allowed fine detail, and its durability. Copper is more durable than canvas or wood panel as a support for oil painting, as it will not rot, mildew or be eaten by insects. Contemporary painters also use copper as a base for paintings, some of them allowing the metal or patina to show through.

Process 
The old masters prepared the copper for painting first by rubbing it with fine pumice abrasive. The copper surface was then treated with garlic juice which is believed to improve adhesion of the paint. Finally a white or grey ground layer of oil paint was applied as a primer. After drying the copper panel was ready for the artist to begin painting. Later artists used the patina process, in which the copper is oxidized with the use of various acidic solutions, as part of the art work itself. The resulting patina or verdigris includes darkening of the metal, green and blue tones, depending on the chemical solution used. Patina is characterized by beautiful variated patterns and textures which occur on the metal’s surface.

Works 

 Isle of the Dead (painting)
 Francesco St Jerome.
 Mars and Venus oil on copper (1605–1610), (São Paulo Museum of Art, São Paulo)
 The Madonna and Child with Saint Anne and an Angel oil on copper, (ca. 1608-1610) Honolulu Museum of Art
 Dead Frog with Flies.
 Self-portrait of Rembrandt, 1630.
 Scylla by Fillipo Lauri.

Materials 

 Copper substrate
 Oil paint

Techniques 
Spray, brush, splatter, verdigris, roller palette knife.

Oil on copper paintings

References

External links

Copper
Painting techniques
Painting materials